Colias montium  is a butterfly in the family Pieridae. It is found in the eastern Palearctic realm (Tibet and China).

Description
The male is yellow above, the inner portion of the forewing not being darkened and the yellow submarginal spots being rather sharply defined. The underside, especially of the forewing,
is more yellow, the hindwing, moreover bearing, yolk-coloured subapical spots and posteriorly black submarginal ones. The female is lighter above, the hindwing is darker proximally, and the light distal margin contrasts with the disc.

Subspecies
C. m. montium Tibet, Sichuan
C. m. viridis O. Bang-Haas, 1915 Qinghai
C. m. longto Evans, 1924 S. Tibet
C. m. fasciata Kocman, 1999 Qinghai

Taxonomy
Accepted as a species by  Josef Grieshuber & Gerardo Lamas

References

Butterflies described in 1886
montium
Butterflies of Asia
Taxa named by Charles Oberthür